Baćevac is a suburban settlement of Belgrade, Serbia. It is located in the municipality of Barajevo. Its population in 2011 was 1,942.

Baćevac is located west of the municipal center of Barajevo, four kilometers east of the major road in western Serbia, Ibarska magistrala (Highway of Ibar) and it is a regional crossroad itself.

Demographics 

Baćevac is a rural settlement whose population, thanks to the proximity of the highway and the city of Belgrade itself, grew one third between the censuses of 1991 and 2002 (1,220 and 1,624 inhabitants, respectively). In 2011, the settlement contained 705 households with an average of 2.75 members. There were 584 families, with 84% of the population being adults and an average age of 44.9.

Campground
One of only three officially designated campsites in Belgrade by 2018 is located in Baćevac. It is situated within the complex of the ethno-household "Zornić's House".

References

Suburbs of Belgrade
Barajevo